Dear Diary is the debut studio album by American rapper Cha Cha. It was released on September 14, 1999 through Epic Records.

Recording sessions ttok place at Noontime Studios, at Triangle Sound Studios, at DARP Studios, at Patchwerk Recording Studio and at Krosswire Studio in Atlanta, at Hit Factory Studios, at Unique Recording Studios and at Lion's Den Studio in New York City, and at Studio A in Detroit.

Production was handled by several high-profile R&B/hip hop record producers, including Bryan-Michael Cox, Deric "D-Dot" Angelettie, Irv Gotti, Jazze Pha and Kevin "She'kspere" Briggs. It features guest appearances from Jim Crow, Bareda, Black Child, Jagged Edge, Ja Rule, Jermaine Dupri, Juvenile, LaTocha Scott, Memphis Bleek, Nas, Trick Daddy and Madd Rapper.

The album peaked at number 86 on the US Billboard Top R&B/Hip-Hop Albums chart. Its lead single "New Millenium (What Cha Wanna Do)" peaked at number 20 in Germany, at number 68 in Switzerland and at number 28 on the US Billboard Hot Rap Songs.

Track listing

Sample credits
Track 5 contains a sample from "Thank You (Falettinme Be Mice Elf Agin)" performed by The Crusaders
Track 13 contains a sample from "Shut The Eff Up (Hoe)" performed by MC Lyte
Track 15 contains a sample of "Sunglasses at Night" performed by Corey Hart

Personnel
Parris "Cha Cha" Fluellen – main artist, vocals, vocal arrangements

Vocalists

Nasir "Nas" Jones – featured artist, vocals, vocal arrangements
LaTocha Scott – featured artist, backing vocals, vocal arrangements
Brandon Casey – featured artist, backing vocals, vocal arrangements
Brian Casey – featured artist, backing vocals, vocal arrangements
Yero Brock – featured artist, vocals, vocal arrangements
Damon "Mr. Mo" Green – featured artist, vocals, vocal arrangements
Jamal "Polow da Don" Jones – featured artist, vocals, vocal arrangements
Maurice "Trick Daddy" Young – featured artist, vocals, vocal arrangements
Ricardo "Cutty Cartel" Lewis – featured artist, vocals, vocal arrangements
Terius "Juvenile" Gray – featured artist, vocals, vocal arrangements
Devon "Bareda" Dowdell – featured artist, vocals, vocal arrangements
Jeffrey "Ja Rule" Atkins – featured artist, vocals, vocal arrangements
Malik "Memphis Bleek" Cox – featured artist, vocals, vocal arrangements
Ramel "Black Child" Gill – featured artist, vocals, vocal arrangements
Deric Angelettie – featured artist, vocals, vocal arrangements
Jermaine Dupri – featured artist, additional vocals, vocal arrangements

Instrumentalists

Benny "Dada" Tillman – drum programming
Carlos "Los Vegas" Thornton – drum programming
Kevin "She'kspere" Briggs – bass, drum programming
Irving "Irv Gotti" Lorenzo – drum programming
Robert "Lil' Rob" Mays – drum programming
Anthony Dent – piano, drum programming
Jeffrey "J-Dub" Walker – piano
Teddy Bishop – drum programming
Phalon "Jazze Pha" Alexander – drum programming
Kevin Hicks – guitar
Eric "Coptic" Matlock – drum programming
Bryan-Michael Cox – drum programming
Donnie Scantz – additional programming

Technicals

Benny Tillman – producer
Carlos Thornton – producer
Arnold "AJ" Wolfe – recording
Kevin Briggs – recording, producer
Alvin Speights – mixing
Claudine Pontier – assistant mixing
Vernon Mungo – assistant mixing
Irving Lorenzo – producer
Rob Mays – producer
Ken "Duro" Ifill – mixing
Brian Stanley – recording
Flip Osman – assistant recording
Steve Mazur – assistant mixing
Anthony Dent – producer
Jeffrey Walker – producer
Steve Capp – recording
Josh Butler – mixing
Jason Hofer – assistant recording
Billy "BC24" Calloway – assistant mixing, A&R
Teddy Bishop – producer
Mike Alvord – recording
Jason Rome – recording
Mike Wilson – recording
Phalon Alexander – producer
Adam Hawkins – recording
Mario Maren – assistant recording
Deric Angelettie – producer
Eric Matlock – producer
Kevin Hicks – mixing, recording
Bryan-Michael Cox – assistant recording, re-mixing
Jermaine Dupri – mixing
Brian Frye – recording
Phil Tan – mixing

Additional

Wendell White – associate executive producer
Ron Jaramillo – art direction, design
Keith Major – photography
James Hunter – graphic design
Adrienne Muhammad – A&R
David McPherson – A&R
Kenyatta "Tally" Galbreth – A&R

Charts

References

External links

1999 debut albums
Epic Records albums
Albums produced by D-Dot
Albums produced by Irv Gotti
Albums produced by Jazze Pha
Hip hop albums by American artists
Albums produced by Bryan-Michael Cox